Corey O'Connor is an American politician serving as the Allegheny County controller in Pennsylvania since Jul 10, 2022. For the 10 years prior to becoming controller, he was a member of the Pittsburgh City Council and represented District 5.

Family and education 
O'Connor was born in Pittsburgh, Pennsylvania, to Bob and Judy Levine O'Connor. He is the youngest brother of Terrence O'Connor, a priest, and Heidy Garth. Like his son, Bob O'Connor also represented District 5 as a member of Pittsburgh City Council from 1992 to 2003, including a four year stint as council president; he was then elected Pittsburgh mayor in 2005, but six months after taking office in January 2006, he was diagnosed with a rare brain cancer and died seven weeks later. In his father's memory, Corey and his family established the Bob O'Connor Memorial Fund. To support the fund, they host the yearly "O'Connor Cookie Cruise" on the Gateway Clipper Fleet, which is attended by thousands.

O'Connor graduated from Central Catholic High School and earned his bachelor's degree in elementary education from Duquesne University. He married Katie Stohlberg on June 29, 2013, and they reside in Pittsburgh's Swisshelm Park neighborhood with their daughter.

Career 
O'Connor has served as the Pittsburgh City Council member for District 5 since January 3, 2012. His district includes the neighborhoods of Glen Hazel, Greenfield, Hays, Hazelwood, Lincoln Place, New Homestead, Regent Square, Squirrel Hill South, and Swisshelm Park.

O'Connor received national media coverage for his response to the Pittsburgh synagogue shooting which happened in his district. He subsequently co-sponsored or supported gun reform legislation. He has also advocated nationally for stricter gun ordinances.

In 2022, O'Connor was nominated by Governor Tom Wolf and then confirmed by a Pennsylvania State Senate committee to become the next Allegheny County Controller, filling the vacancy left when Chelsa Wagner vacated the office on Jan 3, 2022, after being elected in 2021 to serve as a judge the county's Court of Common Pleas. On July 10, 2022, O'Connor resigned as a member of city council and then was immediately sworn in as county controller.

O'Connor's vacated city councilmember position was succeeded by Democrat Barbara Greenwood Warwick in a special election on November 8th 2022.

References

External links

21st-century American politicians
Pittsburgh City Council members
Politicians from Pittsburgh
Living people
Year of birth missing (living people)
Central Catholic High School (Pittsburgh) alumni